Berg Ng Ting-yip (born 12 December 1960) is a Hong Kong actor. He is best known for his role as Inspector Cheung in the 2002 crime thriller film Infernal Affairs.

Filmography

Television
 The Undercover Agents (1984)
 101 Citizen Arrest III (1984)
 Ten Brothers (1985)
 Buddha Jih (1985)
 The Legendary Prime Minister – Zhuge Liang (1985)
 Genghis Khan (1987)
 The Rise and Fall of Qing Dynasty 2 (1988)
 The Legendary Hero (1990)
 Fist of Fury (1995) - Lau Chi Ching
 My Date with a Vampire (1998) - Ken
 My Date with a Vampire 2 (1999) - Shizu Domoto
 The Legendary Siblings (1999) - Du Sha
 Battlefield Network (2000) - Fok Wai Leung
 Showbiz Tycoon (2000) - Tsui Pak
 My Date with a Vampire 3 (2004) - Mr X
 The Men of Justice (2010)
 Infernal Affairs (TVB adaptation version) (2018) - as Inspector Cheung
 The Defected (2019)

Film

References

External links
 
 

Hong Kong male actors
1960 births
Living people
20th-century Hong Kong male actors
21st-century Hong Kong male actors